Bruno Fragoso (born 23 November 1972) is a Portuguese former professional tennis player.

Born in Lisbon, Fragoso competed on the professional tour in the 1990s.

Fragoso, a two-time national singles champion, made his only ATP Tour singles main draw appearance at the 1997 Estoril Open and had a best ranking of 577 in the world. He featured in two Davis Cup ties for Portugal.

See also
List of Portugal Davis Cup team representatives

References

External links
 
 
 

1972 births
Living people
Portuguese male tennis players
Sportspeople from Lisbon